Here is a list of mergers in Osaka Prefecture, Japan since the Meiji era.

Prefectural mergers and border changes 
This list is incomplete. Many changes are missing.

Osaka before 1881 
 1868 (Boshin war/Meiji restoration) – Osaka is established as prefecture (-fu) in succession to the shogunate administration in Osaka (bugyō→saibansho).
 August 1868 (sixth month, Meiji 1) – Sakai (previously shogunate city Sakai and shogunate domain in Izumi province) is established/separated from Osaka as prefecture (-ken).
 1869 – Kawachi (previously shogunate lands in Kawachi province) is established/separated from Osaka as prefecture (-ken).
 1869 – Settsu (previously shogunate lands in Settsu province; later renamed →Toyosaki) is established/separated from Osaka as prefecture (-ken).
 1869 – Toyosaki is split between Osaka and Hyōgo.
 1871/72 (Abolition of domains and first wave of prefectural mergers) – The prefectures Takatsuki and Asada are merged into Osaka. After consolidation, Osaka covers the Eastern part of Settsu province.

Nara before 1876 
See the List of mergers in Nara Prefecture

Sakai 
 1869 – Kawachi is merged into Sakai.
 1870 – Sayama Domain is returned to the central government and merged into Sakai.
 1870 – Mikami Domain with holdings in Ōmi and Izumi provinces moves the domain seat from Mikami in Ōmi (today: Yasu, Shiga) to Yoshimi in Izumi (today: Tajiri, Osaka) and becomes Yoshimi Domain.
 1871/72 (Abolition of domains and first wave of prefectural mergers) – The prefectures Hakata, Kishiwada, Yoshimi and Tannan are merged into Sakai. After consolidation, Sakai encompasses all of Izumi and Kawachi provinces without exclaves/enclaves.
 1876 – Nara is merged into Sakai.
 1881 – Sakai is merged into Osaka prefecture.

Osaka since 1881 
 1887 – Nara prefecture is split off from Osaka prefecture.

District mergers 
This list is incomplete. Some mergers are missing.

 1878–80 (Reactivation of districts as administrative units, establishment of urban districts) – Osaka is subdivided into four urban districts (-ku) and seven [rural] districts (-gun) from ancient Settsu province. Sakai consists of one urban district and four [rural] districts from ancient Izumi province, 16 districts from Kawachi and 15 districts from Yamato (becomes Nara in 1887).
 1896 – The districts Teshima and Nose are merged to form Toyono District.
 1896 – The districts Ōtori and Izumi (from ancient Izumi Province) are merged to form Senboku-gun ("Izumi North district").
 1896 – The districts Hine and Minami (from ancient Izumi Province) are merged to form Sennan-gun ("Izumi South district").
 1896 – The districts Ishikawa, Nishigori, Yakami, Furuichi, Asukabe, Tannan and Shiki (from ancient Kawachi Province) are merged to form Minami-Kawachi ("South Kawachi") District
 1896 – The districts Tanboku, Takayasu, Ōgata, Kawachi, Wakae and Shibukawa (from ancient Kawachi Province) are merged to form Naka-Kawachi ("Central Kawachi") District.
 1896 – The district Matta, Katano and Sasara (from ancient Kawachi Province) are merged to form Kita-Kawachi ("North Kawachi") District.

Municipal mergers
This list is incomplete. Most mergers are missing.

Establishment of modern municipalities 1889/1896 
After the modern municipalities (cities, towns and villages) were introduced and the Great Meiji mergers performed in 1889 and after the 1896 #District mergers, Osaka consisted of:
 2 [district-independent] cities (-shi)
 Four urban districts (Higashi-ku, Nishi-ku, Minami-ku, Kita-ku) become part of the new Osaka City (Ōsaka-shi) in 1889.
 The urban district Sakai (Sakai-ku) becomes Sakai City (Sakai-shi) in 1889.
 9 districts (-gun)
 Nishinari: 2 towns, 30 villages, district seat: Kami-Fukushima-mura ("Upper Fukushima Village")
 Higashinari: 4 towns, 26 villages, district seat: Tennōji Village
 Mishima: 32 villages, district seat: Ibaraki Village
 Toyono: 1 town, 22 villages, district seat: Ikeda Town
 Senboku/Izumi North: 40 villages, district seat: Ōtori Village
 Sennan/Izumi South: 3 towns, 40 villages, district seat: Kishiwada Town
 Minami-/South Kawachi: 41 villages, district seat: Tondabayashi Village
 Naka-/Central Kawachi: 40 villages, district seat: Yao Village
 Kita-/North Kawachi: 2 towns, 31 villages, district seat: Hirakata Town

Mergers 1889–1950 
 1890 – Sawada Village in Shiki District is merged into Dōmyōji Village.
 1892 – Naka-Niwa Village and Minami-Niwa Village in Ōtori District merge to form Niwadani Village.

Mergers in the 1950s (Great Shōwa mergers)

Mergers since the 1960s 
 On February 1, 2005 - The town of Mihara (from Minamikawachi District) was merged into the expanded city of Sakai. Since then, Sakai has been split into wards of which Mihara-ku is one.

References
 Ishida Satoshi: System of prefectures (-fu/-ken) and domains (-han) in the Kinki region, Changes in prefectures (-fu/-ken) in the Kinki region, Changes in districts (-ku/-gun) in the Kinki region, Changes in municipalities (-shi/-chō/-son) in Osaka 
 Sakai City, historical sites: Old location of the Sakai Prefectural Government Building (designated prefectural historical landmark of Osaka) 

Osaka
Geography of Osaka Prefecture